Nahide Babashli (born September 24, 1996) is an Azerbaijani - Turkish singer, lyricist and internet celebrity.

She became famous in Azerbaijan and Turkey after sharing her songs on the internet which received virtual likes and supportive comments. In 2018, Babashli posted a video of herself on YouTube, singing a song titled My Side of the Moon, originally written by the late Murat Göğebakan.

Life 
Babaşlı was born on September 22, 1996 in Baku, Azerbaijan, into a family with 3 children. 

To obtain higher education, she enrolled in the Physics department of the Baku State University. It was during this time that she decided to become a musician, however she was initially unsuccessful. She explained to a reporter: 

With the help of her father, she later began performing her music on broadcasts. She frequently practices singing and reportedly aspires to represent Azerbaijan in international musical competitions.

References 

Turkish pop singers
Azerbaijani pop singers
Living people
1996 births